Westhoff may refer to:

Westhoff Independent School District, public school district based in the community of Westhoff, Texas
Westhoff, Texas, community in Texas

People with the surname
Clara Westhoff (1878–1954), German sculptor
Felipe Westhoff, German-Lithuanian immigrant to Chile and founder of Melinka
Johann Paul von Westhoff (1656–1705), German Baroque composer and violinist
Justin Westhoff, Australian footballer
Matthew Westhoff, Australian footballer, brother of aforementioned Justin
Mike Westhoff, special teams coach for the New York Jets
Victor Westhoff (1916–2001), Dutch botanist